ITM University may refer to:

ITM University (Gwalior), Madhya Pradesh, India
ITM University, Raipur, Naya Raipur, Chhattisgarh, India
ITM Vocational University, Waghodia, Gujarat, India
The NorthCap University, formerly known as ITM University, Gurugram, Haryana, India